"Adam's Ribs" is the debut single by Australian rock band You Am I, from the album Sound as Ever. It was released in 1993 and reached #50 in that year's Hottest 100.

Reception
Junkee said, ""Adam's Ribs" channels the bands heavier and grungier influences through a power-pop streamline. The main riff could just as easily belong to The Who as it could to Nirvana, and that’s entirely a compliment."

Track listing
 "Adam's Ribs" – 3:55
 "Spit" - 1:21
 "Alembic" - 4:06

"Spit" and "Alembic" are You Am I originals.

References

1993 debut singles
You Am I songs
Songs written by Tim Rogers (musician)
1993 songs
Songs written by Andy Kent
Songs written by Mark Tunaley